Casa Verde High School is a career and college preparatory high school in Casa Grande, Arizona. It is part of the Casa Grande Union High School District.

References

Public high schools in Arizona
Schools in Pinal County, Arizona
Buildings and structures in Casa Grande, Arizona